Capital Express may refer to:
 Capital Express Route, an air route operated by Singapore Airlines
 Capital Express (Turkey), a train service that runs between Istanbul and Ankara
 Capital Express (India), a train service that runs between New Jalpaiguri Junction and Rajendra Nagar Terminal